Low Carbon Communities (LCC) is one part of Marches Energy Agency; a leading climate change and sustainable energy social enterprise and a registered charity, based in the West Midlands, England.

LCC works with interested communities to find sustainable energy solutions for their community.  This involves working with households, businesses, schools and community groups to raise awareness about climate change and help implement sustainable energy measures. This includes energy efficiency measures- both technical and behavioural- and renewable energy installations. Ultimately, LCC aims to help communities obtain the skills and knowledge required to achieve community ownership and enable informed decision-making on energy saving opportunities.

A pilot Low Carbon Communities project from 2006-9 in three communities in Shropshire has now ended. The project, based in Ellesmere, Cleobury Mortimer and the “Floodplain Community” (a collection of small villages and farmsteads near Oswestry), aimed to reduce carbon dioxide emissions by 5.88% or 3868 tonnes within these communities. This acted as a pilot for similar ventures around the country and  LCC is now working with a number of communities in the West Midlands and East Midlands.

Awards
In 2009 MEA won an Ashden Award for the Low Carbon Communities project.

External links
Low Carbon Communities
Marches Energy Agency

References

Organisations based in Shropshire
Low-carbon economy